Tuure Nieminen (19 February 1894 – 17 October 1968) was a Finnish ski jumper. He was born in Helsinki. He participated at the 1924 Winter Olympics in  Chamonix, where he placed 13th in ski jumping.

References

External links

1894 births
1968 deaths
Sportspeople from Helsinki
Finnish male ski jumpers
Olympic ski jumpers of Finland
Ski jumpers at the 1924 Winter Olympics
20th-century Finnish people